Ignacio "Nacho" Vigalondo Palacios (born 6 April 1977) is a Spanish filmmaker.

Career
Vigalondo's first film was the 2003 Spanish-language short film 7:35 in the Morning, about a suicide bomber who terrorizes a cafe, which was only eight minutes long. The film won significant accolades: it was nominated for an Academy Award for Best Short Film, got another Best Short Film Award nomination at the European Film Awards, and received the Bronze Moon of Valencia at the Cinema Jove – Valencia International Film Festival, and the Prix UIP Drama at the Drama Short Film Festival.

He finished his first full-length feature film, Los Cronocrímenes (English title: Timecrimes), in 2007, in which he also co-starred.

Vigalondo's next film was the 2011 Spanish-language alien invasion film Extraterrestre.

In 2011, it was reported that Vigalondo was recruited to direct a film adaptation of Mark Millar's Supercrooks.

From 2012 to 2014 he wrote and directed a segment in three different anthology horror films: The ABCs of Death, The Profane Exhibit, and VHS: Viral. In 2014 he also released Open Windows, a techno-thriller film that marked his English-language debut.

Vigalondo's wrote and directed the 2016 film Colossal, which is a twist on the Kaiju genre and an homage to the Godzilla franchise. Before starting production on Colossal, Vigalondo described his plan as to make a serious film with "old school" practical effects on a low budget.

Vigalondo's directed the Hulu original film Pooka, released December 2018 in the Into the Dark series.

Vigalondo directed the first two episodes of the first season of the superhero comedy series The Neighbor (released in 2019) and the entire second season of the Ancient-Rome-set comedy series Justo antes de Cristo (released in 2020).

Filmography

Film

Short films

Acting roles

See also
 List of Spanish Academy Award winners and nominees

References

External links

1977 births
Living people
People from the Saja and Nansa Valleys
Actors from Cantabria
Film directors from Cantabria
Spanish film directors
Science fiction film directors
21st-century Spanish screenwriters